also "Oki Doki" and "Okie Dokie", is the 7th single by Japanese girl group SKE48. It was released on November 9, 2011. It debuted at number-one on the weekly Oricon Singles Chart and, as of April 30, 2012 (issue date), has sold 474,970 copies.

Track listing

Type A

Type B

Type C

Theater Edition

Members

"Okey Dokey" 
 Team S: Masana Ōya, Haruka Ono, Yuria Kizaki, Mizuki Kuwabara, Akari Suda, Kanako Hiramatsu, Jurina Matsui, Rena Matsui, Kumi Yagami, Yukiko Kinoshita
 Team KII: Shiori Ogiso, Akane Takayanagi, Sawako Hata
 Team E: Shiori Kaneko, Kanon Kimoto, Minami Hara

"Hatsukoi no Fumikiri" 
 All Members

"Bazooka Hō Hassha!" 
Shirogumi
 Team S: Yūka Nakanishi, Rikako Hirata, Jurina Matsui
 Team KII: Riho Abiru, Anna Ishida, Mieko Satō, Rina Matsumoto, Tomoka Wakabayashi
 Team E: Kyōka Isohara, Ami Kobayashi, Aya Shibata
 Kenkyūsei: Makiko Saitō

"Hohoemi no Positive Thinking" 
Akagumi
 Team S: Rumi Katō, Shiori Takada, Aki Deguchi, Rena Matsui 
 Team KII: Seira Satō, Airi Furukawa, Manatsu Mukaida, Miki Yakata
 Team E: Kasumi Ueno, Madoka Umemoto, Yukari Yamashita
 Kenkyūsei: Momona Kitō

"Utaōyo, Bokutachi no Kōka" 
Selection 8
 Team S: Masana Ōya, Haruka Ono, Yuria Kizaki, Jurina Matsui, Rena Matsui, Kumi Yagami
 Team KII: Shiori Ogiso, Akane Takayanagi
 Team E: Kanon Kimoto

Oricon Charts

References

External links
 Single at the group's official website 

2011 singles
SKE48 songs
Avex Trax singles
Songs with lyrics by Yasushi Akimoto
Oricon Weekly number-one singles
Billboard Japan Hot 100 number-one singles
2011 songs